David Attwood may refer to:

 David Attwood (film director) (born 1952), English filmmaker
 David Attwood (physicist) (born 1941), American physicist and professor
 Dave Attwood (born 1987), English rugby union player